Daniela Dessì (14 May 1957 – 20 August 2016) was an Italian operatic soprano.

Life and career
Born in Genoa, Italy, Dessì completed her studies at the Arrigo Boito Conservatory in Parma and the Accademia Musicale Chigiana in Siena. She made her operatic debut on 7 December 1978 at Sanremo Casino's theatre as Serpina in La serva padrona by Pergolesi during the season of Savona's Teatro dell'Opera Giocosa. 

In 1980, she distinguished herself as a finalist at the Maria Callas International Competition organized by Italy's RAI TV. Her international career took her to a variety of opera theatres, singing under the direction of conductors such as Riccardo Muti, Claudio Abbado, and the Metropolitan Opera's James Levine.

Dessì's 2008–2009 season began with Tosca in Florence, where she performed an encore of "Vissi d'arte", the first encore at Teatro Comunale di Firenze since Renata Tebaldi's "Amami Alfredo" in 1956. She later performed at the Verdi Theatre in Trieste, and also performed Adriana Lecouvreur in Palermo, Puccini's La fanciulla del West in Seville, Manon Lescaut in Warsaw, Madama Butterfly in Hanover, and Aida in Verona and Cagliari. She closed the season in  Barcelona with Turandot. In January 2009, she opened the season of recital at La Scala.

Dessì's partner was the Italian tenor Fabio Armiliato, with whom she frequently performed and recorded. She died of colon cancer at Poliambulanza Hospital in Brescia on 20 August 2016, at age 59.

Repertoire

Giuseppe Verdi
Ernani, Elvira
Luisa Miller, Luisa
Rigoletto, Gilda
Il trovatore, Leonora
La traviata, Violetta
I Vespri Siciliani, Elena
Simon Boccanegra, Amelia
Un ballo in maschera, Amelia
La forza del destino, Leonora
Don Carlos, Elisabetta
Aida, Aida
Otello, Desdemona
Falstaff, Alice

Giacomo Puccini
Manon Lescaut, Manon
La bohème, Mimì
Tosca, Tosca
Madama Butterfly, Cio-Cio-San
La fanciulla del West, Minnie
Il tabarro, Giorgetta
Suor Angelica, Angelica
Gianni Schicchi, Lauretta
Turandot, Turandot / Liù

Vincenzo Bellini
Norma, Norma

Gaetano Donizetti
Maria Stuarda, Maria
Lucrezia Borgia, Lucrezia
Alina, regina di Golconda, Alina
Don Pasquale, Norina
L'elisir d'amore, Adina
Le convenienze ed inconvenienze teatrali, Corilla
Poliuto, Paolina

Gioachino Rossini
Ciro in Babilonia, Amira
Il signor Bruschino, Sofia
La pietra del paragone, Fulvia
Elisabetta, regina d'Inghilterra, Matilde
Mosè in Egitto, Amaltea
Guglielmo Tell, Matilde
Il Barbiere di Siviglia, Berta

Wolfgang Amadeus Mozart
Le nozze di Figaro, Contessa
Così fan tutte, Fiordiligi
Don Giovanni, Donna Elvira
La Clemenza di Tito, Vitellia

Pietro Mascagni
Cavalleria rusticana, Santuzza
Iris, Iris

Umberto Giordano
Andrea Chénier, Maddalena
Fedora, Fedora
La cena delle beffe, Ginevra

Francesco Cilea
Adriana Lecouvreur, Adriana

Ruggero Leoncavallo
Pagliacci, Nedda
I Medici, Simonetta

Christoph Willibald Gluck
Iphigénie en Tauride, Iphigénie
Orfeo ed Euridice, Euridice

Claudio Monteverdi
L'incoronazione di Poppea, Poppea

Georg Friedrich Händel
Giulio Cesare, Sesto Pompeo

Arrigo Boito
Mefistofele, Margherita

Georges Bizet
Carmen, Micaela

Giovanni Battista Pergolesi
La serva padrona, Serpina
Adriano in Siria, Sabina
Il Flaminio, Flaminio

Domenico Cimarosa
Gli Orazi e i Curiazi, Curiazio
Le astuzie femminili, Bellina
Il convito, Lisetta

Jacques Offenbach
Les Contes d'Hoffmann, Antonia

Amilcare Ponchielli
La Gioconda, Gioconda

Sergei Prokofiev
Igrok, Polina

Nino Rota
Il cappello di paglia di Firenze, Elena

Antonio Salieri
Les Danaïdes, Ipermestra

Tommaso Traetta
Le serve rivali, Carlina

Antonio Vivaldi
Farnace, Selinda

Ermanno Wolf-Ferrari
Sly, Dolly

Riccardo Zandonai
Francesca da Rimini, Francesca

Discography 
 La Traviata. Orchestra del Teatro Regio di Parma, John Neschling, conductor. SoloVoce
 Puccini Arias. Orchestra dell'Arena di Verona, Marco Boemi, conductor. Decca
 Daniela Dessì sings Verdi. Orchestra della Fondazione Toscanini, Steven Mercurio, conductor. Decca
 Umberto Giordano, Andrea Chénier. Armiliato, Guelfi, Rinaldi; Orchestra Sinfonica Verdi Milano, Vjekoslav Šutej, conductor. Universal
 Love Duets. conductor: Marco Boemi. Philips
 Giacomo Puccini, Madama Butterfly. Armiliato, Pons, Plácido Domingo, conductor. Dynamic
 Giacomo Puccini, Tosca. Armiliato, Raimondi. Opus Arte (BBC)
 Giuseppe Verdi, Aida. Armiliato, Fiorillo. Opus Arte (BBC)
 Giacomo Puccini, Manon Lescaut. Armiliato, Vanaud, Mercurio. Real Sound
 Enrico Toselli, Le Romanze Ritrovate. Armiliato, Leonardo Previero, piano. Real Sound	
 Francesco Cilea, Adriana Lecouvreur. Borodina, Larin, Guelfi; Rizzi-Brignoli. TDK
 Domenico Cimarosa, Gli Orazii e i Curiazii. Angeloni, Bolognesi, Alaimo; De Bernart, conductor. Bongiovanni
 Antonio Vivaldi, Il Farnace. Dupuy, Angeloni, Malakova, Gamberucci; De Bernart, conductor. Arkadia Fonit Cetra/Agora Musica
 Gioachino Rossini, Il barbiere di Siviglia. Raffanti, Depuy, Portella; Zedda, conductor. Frequenz
 Gioachino Rossini, Ciro in Babilonia. Palacio, Calvi, Antonucci; Rizzi, conductor. Bongiovanni

Awards
 Premio Flaviano Labó (2010)
 Premio Operaclick (2009)
 Premio Città di Varese (2009)
 Premio Myrta Gabardi (2009)
 Pentagramma d'Oro Comune di Marnate (2009)
 Premio Abbiati (2008)
 Regina della Lirica dalla Associazione Tiberini a San Lorenzo in Campo (2007)
 Premio Le Muse (2007)
 Premio Zenatello Arena di Verona
 Premio Giordano Comune di Baveno
 Premio Giacomo Puccini Torre del Lago
 Premio Cilea di Reggio Calabria
 Gigli d’Oro Comune di Recanati
 Premio Liguria Comune di Genova
 Premio E. Mazzoleni Palermo
 Mascagni d’Oro Bagnara di Romagna
 Premio Giuditta Pasta Saronno

References

External links
Official website

Streamopera.com/Daniela Dessì 

1957 births
2016 deaths
Deaths from cancer in Lombardy
Italian operatic sopranos
Musicians from Genoa
21st-century Italian women opera singers
Deaths from colorectal cancer
20th-century Italian women opera singers
Accademia Musicale Chigiana alumni